Piz Pian Grand is a mountain of the Lepontine Alps, situated between the Val Calanca and the Mesolcina in the Swiss canton of Graubünden.

References

External links
 Piz Pian Grand on Hikr

Mountains of Graubünden
Mountains of the Alps
Lepontine Alps
Mountains of Switzerland